Baldric de Segillo was Archdeacon of Leicester from 1163 to 1177.

He was Master of King Stephen's Writing Chamber and a Prebendary of Lincoln Cathedral.

Notes

See also
 Diocese of Lincoln
 Diocese of Peterborough
 Diocese of Leicester
 Archdeacon of Leicester

Archdeacons of Leicester
12th-century English clergy
Lincoln Cathedral